Fleetwood Ernest Varley (11 October 1862 – 26 March 1936) was a British sport shooter who competed in the 1908 Summer Olympics and 1912 Summer Olympics.

In the 1908 Olympics, Varley won a silver medal in the team military rifle event. Four years later, Varley was 50th in the 300 metre military rifle, three positions event and 27th in the 600 metre free rifle event.

See also
 List of Olympic medalists in shooting
 Great Britain at the 1908 Summer Olympics
 Great Britain at the 1912 Summer Olympics
 Shooting at the 1908 Summer Olympics

References

1862 births
1936 deaths
British male sport shooters
Olympic shooters of Great Britain
Shooters at the 1908 Summer Olympics
Shooters at the 1912 Summer Olympics
Olympic silver medallists for Great Britain
Olympic medalists in shooting
Medalists at the 1908 Summer Olympics
Sportspeople from London